Acanthobrama  orontis is a species of freshwater cyprinid fish, which is endemic to  Turkey.

References

orontis
Taxa named by Lev Berg
Fish described in 1949